Basilica di Santa Croce (Italian for 'Basilica of the Holy Cross') is a Baroque style church that was completed in 1695 in Lecce, Apulia, Italy.

History 
Walter VI, Count of Brienne, had founded in the current church's location a monastery in the 14th century. In 1549, a new church was begun, using, among the others, houses from Jews who had been ousted from Lecce in 1510. The construction dragged on for two centuries; by 1582, the lower façade had been finished, while the dome was completed in 1590. The portals were added starting in 1606, under the direction of Francesco Antonio Zimbalo. The church was completed by his successors Cesare Penna (upper façade and the rose window) and Giuseppe Zimbalo (decoration of the upper façade).

Exterior 
The church has a richly decorated façade, with six smooth columns supporting an entablature, with animals, grotesque figures and vegetables, and has a large rose window. The main portal has a pair of Corinthian columns and the coats of arms of Philip III of Spain, Mary of Enghien and Walter VI of Brienne, while on the side portals are those of the Celestines. Several atlantes would represent the Turk prisoners made by the Christian League at the Battle of Lepanto (1571). The animals under the balustrade would symbolize the Christian powers which participated in the battle: the dragon was the symbol of the Boncompagni, family of Pope Gregory XIII; the griffon the Republic of Genoa, Hercules the Grand Duke of Tuscany

Interior 
The interior, on the Latin cross plan, had originally a nave and four aisles, two of which were turned into side chapels in the 18th century. The church has seventeen altars: the main one has a decorated portal with the coat of arms of the Adorni family, whose tombs were inside the basilica. Notable is also that of St. Francis of Paola, a Baroque piece of art by Francesco Antonio Zimbalo.

The nave has a rich wooden caisson ceiling.

References 

Baroque architecture in Apulia
Churches in the province of Lecce
Religious buildings and structures in Lecce
Roman Catholic churches completed in 1695
Santa Croce, Basilica di
17th-century Roman Catholic church buildings in Italy
1695 establishments in Italy